Nsang Dilong  born  (Bodi Nsang Dilong) in August  1994) is a Cameroonian  actress, social worker and  a model. She was the winner of 2011 edition of  Miss West Africa Cameroon Competition (MWACC). In 2015, she was a TV host at Fox Broadcasting Company

Early life 
Nsang Dilong was born Bodi Nsang Dilong in Buea Cameroon, she is  native of  Kotto Barombi in Kumba and no information about her real date of birth has been published, she was born around 1994. During her secondary school days, she studied at PCSS Buea and completed at PHS in Kumba. She had a Bachelor of Science in Sociology in 2011 at University of Buea.

Career
In 2011 she won the Miss West Africa Cameroon Competition (MWACC). In 2013, she was a contenstant of Miss Cameroon  Beauty Pageant, she has star in movies such as Whisper, Expression, she also star in Zamba, an award-winning television series. In 2015, she was a Television host in a program called African-focus show meant for Fox Broadcasting Company (Fox 28).When the offer was given to her, she said Apart from celebrity, she works as a social worker for an NGO in Buea. She was number 10 on the list of 2016 Ranking of 50 Most Influential Young Cameroonians by  Avance Media & CELBMD Africa.

Selected filmography
Zamba (2016) with Epule Jeffrey
Whisper (2012)
Rumble
Expression

See also 

List of Cameroonian Actors
Cinema of Cameroon

References

External links

Living people
Cameroonian film directors
Cameroonian actresses
1994 births
People from Buea